Matlock was an Urban District in Derbyshire, England from 1894 to 1974. It was created under the Local Government Act 1894.

The district was abolished in 1974 under the Local Government Act 1972 and combined with the Ashbourne, Bakewell and Wirksworth Urban Districts and the Ashbourne and Bakewell Rural Districts to form the new West Derbyshire district.

References

Districts of England created by the Local Government Act 1894
Districts of England abolished by the Local Government Act 1972
History of Derbyshire
Urban districts of England
Matlock, Derbyshire